Lukas Wenig (born 18 September 1994) is a professional German darts player who plays in Professional Darts Corporation events.

Wenig qualified for his first PDC European Tour tournament in 2019, when he qualified for the 2019 German Darts Open, but he lost in the first round to Chris Dobey.

References

External links

1994 births
Living people
German darts players
Professional Darts Corporation associate players
Sportspeople from Marburg